Karnataka Prevention of Slaughter and Preservation of Cattle Act, 2010 is the law passed by the Karnataka Legislative Assembly in March 2010. The Act prohibits the slaughter of cows and calves of she-buffaloes, male or female. It also aimed at the preservation and improvement of the breeds of cattle and to endeavour to organise agriculture and animal husbandry in terms of Article 48 of the Constitution of India. The governor has forwarded the bill to the President of India.

The bill was withdrawn by the Karnataka State legislature in 2014.

References

2010 in law
Proposed laws of India
2010 in India
Animal welfare and rights legislation
Karnataka state legislation
Animal welfare and rights in India